Frank Sherwood Gell (April 4, 1928 – January 13, 2020) was an American film and television actor. He was known for playing General J. E. B. Stuart in the American historical television series The Gray Ghost.

Early life
He was born Frank Sherwood Gell in Detroit, Michigan, to Louis Gell and Freida Gell, Jewish immigrants from Imperial Russia who had come to the US as young children. He had one sibling, an older sister. His parents had different first languages (Russian and Yiddish); he grew up speaking only English. His father owned a butcher shop. His parents divorced while Price was still a child. His mother remarried, and Price was raised by her and his step-father Herman Glassman, a clothing salesman.

Price attended Central High School in Detroit, taking the commercial curriculum rather than college prep. While still in high school he registered for the draft on April 4, 1946, his eighteenth birthday. The registrar recorded him as being 5 feet 11 inches and weighing 132 pounds, with brown hair and brown eyes. He worked as a dishwasher, theater usher, and gas station attendant to earn money for drama school.

Early stage career
Price enrolled at the Schuster-Martin School of Drama in the Walnut Hills neighborhood of Cincinnati during August 1947. He spent one year studying then joined the school's Little Playhouse Company after graduation. He performed in five plays during 1948-1949, using "Sherwood Gell" for billing.

He then joined the Piper Players national touring company in their Oklahoma City debut, where he handled both acting and production chores. The Piper Players hit a cash crisis and found their only money maker was doing children's matinees of Little Red Riding Hood, which they played around the country. When the tour he was with reached the Warner Hollywood Theatre, Price decided to remain and left the company, moving in with his married older sister and her family.
 
By 1952 he had adopted the stage name "Sherwood Price". He was managing a movie theater in Sherman Oaks when he performed in his first film. The cheaply made western Scorching Fury was filled with actors making their film debut. There is no contemporary evidence that the film was ever distributed for exhibition at theaters, but it gave the participating actors their "break" in the movie business and their Screen Actors Guild cards.

His first known stage credit under his new billing came in May 1953, when he played the lead in the Showcase Theater production of Detective Story, earning high praise from the LA Times drama critic.

Tustin Playbox

During July 1953 Price took the role of the psychoanalyst in the play Lady in the Dark with the Tustin Playbox company. It was his first work with this community theatre, which he would be associated with for many years. Also in this play was professional Jacquelyn Sue Browne, then billed as "Cathy Browne", but who would later switch to Kathie Browne. Price and Cathy Browne took over as co-producers for the third summer season (1954) of the Tustin Playbox, while continuing to act in performances. Browne was very popular with the Tustin audiences, and so often played the female lead. The majority of production chores thus fell on Price, who performed in fewer plays than Browne.

For the next four years Browne and Price successfully co-produced the Playbox, with each season bringing in larger audiences, including television stars and producers who hired them for screen roles based on their stage performances. The Los Angeles Times noted that the Playbox was actually making money, a rare event for community summer stock. The ailing Laguna Playhouse even recruited the couple to take over producing chores there as well for the 1957 season.

By the 1959 season Sherwood Price Productions assumed sole control of the Tustin Playbox, while Browne's performances there tapered off in favor of her growing screen career.  However, for the 1960 season Price overextended himself financially by opening a second troupe in Fullerton, California, causing both to be attached in July by creditors.

Television and other projects
Price's first television work came in the fall of 1955. Mark Stevens arranged for Price to have a role in an episode of the series in which he was starring, Big Town, after seeing him at Tustin. The next year, John Bromfield of Sheriff of Cochise did the same, after watching Price in The Tender Trap at the Playbox Price had parts in three other TV series in 1956, and small uncredited bits in two films, The Revolt of Mamie Stover and the misleadingly titled D-Day the Sixth of June.

Despite the press of activity managing the Tustin Playbox, Price plunged into a recurring role on the series The Gray Ghost. Filmed during late spring of 1957 in Northern California, Price played General J.E.B. Stuart for seven episodes.

Later screen career
Price then played Pete Hallon in the 1959 film City of Fear, which starred Vince Edwards.

Price played Gus Romay in the 1961 film Blueprint for Robbery, which starred J. Pat O'Malley. He guest-starred in television programs including Gunsmoke, Bonanza, Rawhide, Highway Patrol, Perry Mason, The Life and Legend of Wyatt Earp, Mannix, 77 Sunset Strip, Cheyenne, Death Valley Days, The Misadventures of Sheriff Lobo, Have Gun - Will Travel, and Wagon Train. Price had a recurring role as Owen Carter in the medical drama television series Ben Casey. He also played Lt. Edgar Hackett in the 1968 film  Ice Station Zebra, which starred Rock Hudson, Ernest Borgnine, Patrick McGoohan and Jim Brown. In 1969, Price starred with Robert Vaughn in the play The Odd Couple at the Sir John Falstaff Theater in St. Louis, Missouri. He played Felix Unger.

Price died in January 2020, at the age of 91.

Personal life
After a summer working together, Cathy Browne and Price announced their engagement in September 1953. They were wed November 22, 1953, at the Chapman Park Hotel in Los Angeles.

In his 2008 memoir, A Fortunate Life, actor Robert Vaughn describes Price as his "lifelong best friend". They were also business partners, making documentaries through their Ferdporqui production company.

Stage performances

Filmography

Notes

References

External links 

Rotten Tomatoes profile

1928 births
2020 deaths
People from Detroit
Male actors from Detroit
American male film actors
American male television actors
20th-century American male actors